The Oxford Tunnel, also known as the Van Nest Gap Tunnel, was one of seven tunnels built to complete the Warren Railroad, which formed part of Lackawanna Railroad's 400-mile mainline. The tunnel was completed in 1862, and was retrofitted with a gauntlet track by 1900.

History 
The completion of the tunnel was delayed due to inconsistent funding, American Civil War-era technology, and issues with digging through gneiss. The construction of the Warren Railroad required the completion of three bridges, two tunnels (the other tunnel being at Manuka Chuck), and cuts and fills.

The tunnel was completed in September 1862. Later on, as train cars became larger, it became impossible to allow two tracks to fit through the tunnel. To address the issue, by 1900, a gauntlet track, which permits two tracks that closely overlap to pass through the tunnel together, was installed. The gauntlet track maximized the overhead and side clearances in the tunnel, but restricted the tunnel to a single-track section, creating a bottleneck on the line. In the end, the building of the Lackawanna Cut-Off would be the only solution that worked. In August 2018 there was a second major collapse in the tunnel. While still passable it is not without significant risk.

References 
 The Van Nest Gap Tunnel.  October 6, 1862. The New York Times. Retrieved May 18, 2012.
 On the Six-Foot Gauge: Hiking the Original Warren Railroad Right-of-Way by John Drennan, June 2006, The Block Line. The Quarterly Journal of the Tri-State Railway Historical Society. Retrieved Mar 25, 2015.

External links
Lost in Jersey - Oxford Tunnel

Railroad tunnels in New Jersey
Delaware, Lackawanna and Western Railroad tunnels
Erie Lackawanna Railway
Transportation buildings and structures in Warren County, New Jersey